This is the results breakdown of the local elections held in the Balearic Islands on 25 May 2003. The following tables show detailed results in the autonomous community's most populous municipalities, sorted alphabetically.

Opinion polls

Sant Josep de sa Talaia polling

Overall

City control
The following table lists party control in the most populous municipalities, including provincial capitals (shown in bold). Gains for a party are displayed with the cell's background shaded in that party's colour.

Municipalities

Calvià

Ciutadella de Menorca
Population: 24,741

Ibiza
Population: 37,408

Inca
Population: 24,467

Llucmajor
Population: 26,466

Manacor
Population: 33,326

Maó-Mahón
Population: 25,187

Palma de Mallorca
Population: 358,462

Santa Eulària des Riu
Population: 25,080

See also
2003 Balearic regional election

References

Balearic Islands
2003